The S-5 (first designated ARS-57) is a rocket weapon developed by the Soviet Air Force and used by military aircraft against ground area targets. It is in service with the Russian Air Force and various export customers. It is based on a German design from World War 2.

It is produced in a variety of sub-types with different warheads, including HEAT anti-armour (S-5K), high-explosive fragmentation (S-5M/MO), smoke, and incendiary rounds.

Development
In 1946 the Soviet Nudelman Precision Engineering Design Bureau (then designated OKB-16) undertook technical research of unguided air to air missiles in aircraft armament. As part of the bureaus research, captured examples of the German 55mm R4M "Orkan" (Engl: Hurricane) unguided air to air missile were closely studied. After 5 years, the Soviet ministry of defense finally provided official status and funding of the project in 1951, originally as part of the air-to-air AS-5 weapon system for the MiG-19. The rockets were tested in a series of configurations on MiG-15bis and MiG-17 jets, with the final tests complete on a MiG-17PF in January 1955. The tests revealed that the rockets did not perform as expected against aerial targets. The rocket ARS-57 was accepted into service in April 1955, with a military designation S-5.

Apart from the Soviet Union and then Russia, S-5 rockets were produced among others in Poland. As of 2013, the only producers remained Belarus and Bulgaria.

S-5U
In late 2019, Russia announced it would resume production of the S-5 rocket for the first time since production ceased in 1990. It runs on composite propellant rather than a solid fuel motor and is spin-stabilized through four curved fins wrapped around the rocket nozzle to match its diameter when stored. It features a universal warhead that can penetrate  of armor, explode into 500  splinters, and has incendiary elements; combat efficiency is claimed to be comparable to the S-8 rocket.

Description

The S-5 is a   calibre unguided rocket fired from a 57 mm calibre tube. It is used by fighter bombers and helicopters. It consists of a steel body containing a solid fuel rocket, and a high-explosive warhead with a mechanical impact fuse. At the rear of the rocket is an elongated exhaust nozzle, with eight attached forward folding wings. The fins fold around the rocket when it is stowed in its launch tube, springing back as soon as it leaves the launch tube. In flight, the very slightly angled fins exert a stabilizing spin to the rocket, turning at approximately 750 rpm.

The S-5 is carried in rocket pods, with between four and 32 rockets. The first were ORO-57 launchers, made in variants with capacity of four, eight and 16 rockets. The most typical became the ORO-57K for eight rockets, used especially on the MiG-19. Then, beginning in the early 1960s, the typical launcher became the UB-16-57, with 16 rockets, developed in several variants, for helicopters and planes. UB stands for "universal block" (universalnyi blok), as it could be carried on conventional bomb hardpoints, "57" refers to the actual diameter of the launch tube (the diameter of the rocket plus 2 mm). The first variant and UB-16-57U had a conical forward part while the next variant UB-16-57D had a blunt forward part. Starting in 1968, the UB-16-57UMP variant was produced, with a conical forward part and five protruding inner tubes. In the 1970s, the UB-32 was developed with 32 rockets, carried by heavier aircraft.

In Poland, the Mars-2 launcher for 16 rockets was developed in variants for Lim-6bis aircraft and Mi-2URN helicopters. In Romania, the LPR 57 launcher for 16 rockets was developed.

Operational history

Afghanistan
S-5 rockets were used extensively by Sukhoi Su-25 and Mil Mi-24 aircraft in Afghanistan in the 1980s, where their effectiveness was considered poor. Pilots described the rockets fanning out after launch "like a tulip", and that the warhead was only good for "tickling the dookhi's (mujahedeen) heels". The Russian forces have shifted to higher-calibre weapons like the S-8 rocket instead. In addition the Soviet 40th Army made use of improvised launchers mounted on T-62 tanks, BTR-70 APCs and Ural-4320 trucks in a ground-to-ground role.

Chechnya
S-5 and S-8 rockets were used in the First Chechen War and the Second Chechen War. These rockets were then salvaged by Chechen fighters to be used as anti-tank rocket launcher in their “Shaitan” homemade weapons. Such weapons were unpredictable, as some were made from gear shafts of Russian trucks. Also such rockets were damaged during their capture. These rockets were taken from downed Mil-24 helicopters. ""

Israel
On Sunday, 6 January 2009, The Israel Defense Forces claimed they identified a rocket fired at Israel earlier in the day by Al-Qassan in the Gaza Strip as a Russian-made S5K.

According to the IDF, the rocket fired at Kibbutz Alumim in the Negev marked the first time Izz ad-Din al-Qassam Brigades have used this type of weapon.

Although the weapon is intended to be launched aerially, Al-Qassam forces chose to launch their rocket from ground-based launchers. Unlike a Qassam rocket, the S5K contains more explosives, but is less precise.

On Friday, 8 December 2017, two S-5 rockets fired from the Gaza Strip landed on Sderot.

Libya
The S-5, along with S-8 and S-13 rockets, has been deployed from the backs of pick-up trucks (generally, technicals) during the 2011 Libyan civil war, serving as a makeshift MLRS. UB-16 and UB-32 pods were used in this role. The rebels have also developed a man-portable launcher for the S-5, turning the rocket into a makeshift RPG round.

Pakistan 
The 57mm S-5 rockets were used by the Pakistan Air Force with their Shenyang F-6s against Indian ground targets at Shakargarh sector during the Battle of Shakargarh in 1971. In total, 188 rockets were fired from the F-6s ORO-57K launcher.

Syria
The S-5 has seen use by the Syrian Air Force against opposition forces in the Syrian civil war. It has also been used as an improvised ground-launched rocket, fired from UB-16 or UB-32 pods.

Launcher characteristics

ORO-57K
 rockets: 8
 length × diameter: 1,447 × 220 mm
 weight, empty: 33 kg
 weight, loaded: 74 kg
 launch platform: MiG-19/F-6

UB-16-57

 rockets: 16
 length × diameter: 1,880 × 335 mm
 weight, empty: 57 kg
 weight, loaded: 138 kg
 reusable: yes
 launch platforms: MiG-21, Su-7, Mi-8, improvised mountings on armoured vehicles and technicals (various variants of UB-16-57)

UB-32

 rockets: 32
 length × diameter: 2,080 × 481 mm
 weight, empty: 103 kg
 weight, loaded: 264 kg
 reusable: yes
 launch platforms: MiG-21, MiG-23, MiG-27, Su-7, Su-17/20/22, Su-25, Mi-17, Mi-24, improvised mountings on armoured vehicles and technicals

Rocket specifications

See also
 RS-82 rocket
 S-8 rocket
 Ugroza, a proposed upgrade of "dumb" rockets to salvo-fired laser-guided precision missiles

References

Bibliography
 Soviet/Russian Aircraft Weapons Since World War Two, Yefim Gordon, 
 Mil Mi-24 Hind Attack Helicopter, Yefim Gordon and Dimitri Komissarov, 
 Jane's Air Launched Weapons Issue 36, Duncan Lennox,

External links
 
 
 

Air-to-ground rockets of the Soviet Union
Military equipment introduced in the 1950s